ChaSen  is a morphological parser for the Japanese language. This tool for analyzing morphemes was developed at the Matsumoto laboratory, Nara Institute of Science and Technology.

See also 
 MeCab

References

External links
 ChaSen home page
 Nara Institute of Science and Technology Matsumoto Laboratory

Natural language processing
Japanese language